SSHL may refer to:
 Sigtunaskolan Humanistiska Läroverket, a boarding school in Sweden
 Sudden sensorineural hearing loss
 Saskatchewan Senior Hockey League, a defunct Canadian amateur ice hockey league